District 60 of the Oregon House of Representatives is one of 60 House legislative districts in the state of Oregon. As of 2013, the boundary for the district includes all of Baker, Grant, Harney, and Malheur counties and a portion of Lake County. Oregon's sixtieth state house district is currently held by Mark Owens. It was previously represented by Republican Representative Lynn Findley who was appointed to the Oregon State Senate on January 6, 2020.

Election results
District boundaries have changed over time; therefore, representatives before 2013 may not represent the same constituency as today. General election results from 2000 to present are as follows:

See also
 Oregon Legislative Assembly
 Oregon House of Representatives

References

External links
 Oregon House of Representatives Official site
 Oregon Secretary of State: Redistricting Reform Task Force

Oregon House of Representatives districts
Baker County, Oregon
Grant County, Oregon
Harney County, Oregon
Lake County, Oregon
Malheur County, Oregon